

History 
Mirroring the TV show The Amazing Race, the founder of Red Frog Events, Joe Reynolds wanted to give people the opportunity to experience that same type of competitive adventure. At the time, Reynolds owned and operated his own house painting business. In 2007, Reynolds organized and launched Great Urban Race, LLC which held its first race on September 15 in Chicago, Illinois.

After the Chicago race, Reynolds, with the help of friend and business partner Ryan Kunkel, put on seven more races around the United States that year. By 2008, Great Urban Race had expanded to 20 cities nationwide, including a national championship race held in Las Vegas for a $10,000 grand prize.

Throughout the first four years of the event, Great Urban Race has had over 34,000 participants.

After the growth of Great Urban Race, Reynolds and Kunkel launched another race series, Warrior Dash, and renamed the company to Red Frog Events.

2007 
The inaugural Great Urban Race took place in Chicago in 2007, spurring seven other events. In less than four months Great Urban Race went from a single race to a national event.

2008 
Great Urban Race took place in 20 cities in 2008. This season was the first to have a National Championship that was hosted in Las Vegas, NV. The National Championship was between the top 25 teams from the 19 qualifying races throughout the year.

2009 
2009 was another year of growth as the participant attendance doubled. The National Championship changed locations to New Orleans, LA.

2010 
2010 marked the first international Great Urban Race. On July 17, 2010, there was a Great Urban Race in Toronto, Ontario, Canada.

2011 Season
The 2011 season expanded the international events, adding Sydney, Australia and London, England to the list of locations. The number of events went from 24 in 2010 to 40 events in 2011.

2012 Season 
Great Urban Race scheduled 21 events in 2012, solely in the United States.

2013 Season 
Great Urban Race scheduled 20 events 2013, with an international race in Toronto, Ontario, Canada and the championship in San Juan, Puerto Rico.

General Information 
Registration for Great Urban Race is available both online and onsite[1]
 Registration includes a T-shirt, race-bib, clue sheet, medals for the teams, and post-race refreshments.
 Teams may have 2 to 4 members.
 Participants must be at least 14 years or older to compete.
 Participants are encouraged to wear matching themed costumes. There is a prize for the team with the best costume after each race.
 The course is designed for the fastest teams to finish in 1.5 to 3 hours, with the majority finishing in 3 to 4 hours. The race course is shut down after 5 hours.
 The distance of the race depends on the route taken by each team. Typically a race is between 4 and 8 miles.

Race Details 
On race day, the Great Urban Race website suggests participants arrive a half-hour to an hour before the start time. At 12 pm, sealed envelopes containing the clue sheet are distributed and the race begins. Rules for the race are:
 There can be up to four members per team. As of 2012, there are no adult or family divisions.
 Teams may travel by foot or public transit, which includes buses, trains, subways, and public trolleys. No taxis, bikes, or roller blades are allowed.
 Teams are allowed to solve clues in any order they choose. Some teams solve all clues and map out a route before leaving the start line, while others prefer to solve clues en route.
 Teams are required to finish 11 of 12 clues correctly. The clock begins once the clue envelopes are opened, and times are recorded as teams cross the finish line under the Great Urban Race finish arch.
 Penalties are given to teams who did not complete or incorrectly completed a clue. For each clue not completed correctly, teams receive a 30-minute penalty that will be added to their final time.
 After penalty adjustments, teams with times longer than five hours will receive a DNF (did not finish).

Clues 
Clues vary between race locations and include physical challenges, puzzles, brainteasers and interaction with the public. Examples of past clues include: Greek dancing lessons, learning how to surf, Segway riding, Tae Kwon Do lessons, bicycle racing, fish wrangling, anagrams, cryptograms, etc.

Awards 
Every Great Urban Race concludes with an awards ceremony and costume contest.  Cash prizes are awarded to the top three teams. 
1st place: $300
2nd place: $200
3rd place: $100

 The top three places are also awarded free entry into the Championship Race.
 the Top 25 teams qualify for the Championship Race.
 Best Costume: Teams nominate themselves for this award and the winner is judged by crowd applause.
 The St. Jude Hero award is given to the first team that crosses the finish line wearing a St. Jude cape, signifying they've raised at least $250 for St. Jude
 The St. Jude Top fundraising winners qualify to compete in the Championship Race.

Charity Partnerships 

Great Urban Race partners with St. Jude Children's Research Hospital on a national level. Participants are encouraged to register as St. Jude Heroes and raise funds for St. Jude Children's Research Hospital. Heroes that raise at least $250 are eligible for race day prizes. A St. Jude representative is present at each race and determines fundraising totals.

Red Frog Events donates an additional $10 for every person who registers as a St. Jude Hero and commits to raising funds for St. Jude Children's Research Hospital. 2009 was the first year Great Urban Race partnered with St. Jude and since then, Red Frog Events and Great Urban Race has raised over $300,000 for St. Jude Children's Research Hospital.

Great Urban Race also pairs with local philanthropic organizations at each event. One clue at each race requires participants to donate a needed item to a local charity. Past charities have included Ronald McDonald House, food banks, and shelters.

Championship Race 

The Championship Race consists of two parts: a preliminary race from 9am-1pm and the Elite Eight race which is from 2pm-5pm. The top eight teams compete in the Elite Eight race which consists of intricate clues throughout the designated city. The top team from the Elite Eight race wins a prize of $10,000.
Afterwards, Red Frog Events hosts a post-race party for all participants in the city where the race is held.

References

External links
Great Urban Race
Red Frog Events
Red Frog Events Blog
Facebook: Great Urban Race
Twitter: Great Urban Race
YouTube

Scavenger hunts